The MDV 1200 class fast ferry is a class of six vessels built by Fincantieri in Italy. Four of these vessels were for Sea Containers, with the other two vessels being for Ocean Bridge Investments.

History
The MDV1200 craft were built for Ocean Bridge Investments, and were delivered in 1996 (Pegasus One) and 1997 (Pegasus Two) respectively. Pegasus One was sold to Tallink, and later to Stena Line. In 2007 she was sold to Aegean Speed Lines and was renamed Speedrunner II. In 2014, Speedrunner II was sold to Naviera Paraguana and was renamed Paraguana I. Pegasus Two currently operates at Arab Bridge Marinetime, under the name Queen Nefertiti.

The MDV1200II craft were built for Sea Containers. The first two craft (SuperSeaCat One and SuperSeaCat Two) were delivered in 1997, the third and fourth craft (SuperSeaCat Three and SuperSeaCat Four) followed in 1999.

Originally built for operating on the English Channel, the venture was operated by Hoverspeed. The SuperSeaCat operation didn't last on the Channel, as in 1998 the SuperSeaCat Two went on operations with the Isle of Man Steam Packet Company for a year. The following year the SuperSeaCat Three operated for the Steam Packet, undertaking her Maiden Voyage with the company between Liverpool and Douglas.

Since then, the SuperSeaCat One, Three and Four operated for Silja Line. In 2003, the SuperSeaCat Two went on a long-term charter to the Isle of Man Steam Packet Company. In 2005, the first of the quartet, the SuperSeaCat One, was sold to Trasmediterránea, as the Almudaina Dos. In 2021, Almudaina Dos was sold to Greek ferry company Horizon Sea Lines and was renamed HSC Santa Irini.

It was revealed in 2008 that Sea Containers had sold the SuperSeaCat Three and Four to Aegean Speed Lines, who operate the two ships on their usual Helsinki-Tallinn route. SuperSeaCat 3 was renamed Speedrunner 3 and SuperSeaCat 4 was renamed Speedrunner 4 (IV). It was also revealed in 2008 that the SuperSeaCat Two would operate as the Viking for the remainder of her charter to the Steam Packet. In 2009, the Viking was sold to Hellenic Seaways and renamed Hellenic Wind. In 2016, Hellenic Wind remained at the same company and was renamed Hellenic Highspeed. In 2022, she was chartered to AML (Africa Morroco Link).

In 2016, Speedrunner IV was sold to Greek ferry company Golden Star Ferries and was renamed Super Runner. In 2021, Super Runner was sold to Seajets and was renamed HSC Super Runner Jet.

In 2022, Speedrunner 3 was sold to Seajets and was renamed HSC Speedrunner Jet.

Vessels

Layout 
 Deck 1: Bridge
 Deck 2: Upper passenger deck, open deck
 Deck 3: Lower passenger deck, retail facilities
 Deck 4: Car deck
 Deck 5: Engine room, fuel tanks

External links 

 SuperSeaCat service Helsinki - Tallinn by Sea Containers

References

Ferry classes
Ferries of the United Kingdom
Ferries of France
Ferries of Finland
Ferries of the Republic of Ireland
High-speed craft
Ships built in Italy
Ships built by Fincantieri